Jørgen Niclasen (born 17 January 1969 in Sørvágur) is a Faroese politician. He served as the leader of the Faroese People's Party (Fólkaflokkurin) from 2007 to 2022. 

On 2 October 2008, he was officially appointed Kaj Leo Johannesen's Deputy Prime Minister, which he was until the 2011 Faroese parliamentary election. He was reelected and became the Minister of Finance in the Cabinet of Kaj Leo Johannesen II.

Niclasen again became minister of finance and deputy prime minister in Bárður á Steig Nielsen's cabinet following the 2019 Faroese general election. He resigned on 16 February 2022 after having been discovered to have driven while intoxicated six days prior. He was subsequently also forced to step down as party leader.

References

External links

Jørgen Niclasen at the Prime Minister's Office 
Jørgen Niclasen at the Ministry of Foreign Affairs 

Living people
1969 births
Members of the Løgting
Foreign Ministers of the Faroe Islands
Finance Ministers of the Faroe Islands
Fisheries Ministers of the Faroe Islands
Deputy Prime Ministers of the Faroe Islands
People's Party (Faroe Islands) politicians
21st-century Danish politicians